Hapkidowon (Hangul:합기도원),also known as World Hapkido Headquarters (Hangul: 세계합기도본부), and Foundation of the World Hapkido, was founded by Hong Sik Myung in 1981 in the US state of Michigan. Hapkidowon is the center of Hapkido instructor education, issues official instructor Dan (black belt) and certifications, provides seminars and leads and guides the Hapkido organization and school. Hapkidowon trains leaders of the art on sound mind, body and spirit in accordance with the principles of Hapkido. Hapkidowon focuses on unity and the interests of Hapkido artists. Hapkidowon rewards those who contribute to the improvement of the art, the community and Hapkidowon itself.

Brief history
Hong Sik Myung started Hapkido at WonHyo Dojang in 1960. He participated in "1st Korean National Hapkido Unified Demonstration" at Seoul, Korea, in 1968. He became an instructor of Korea Hapkido YonMuKwan SangDo Dojang in 1970. He became a chief master instructor of Korea Hapkido YonMuKwan (대한합기도연무관, also spelled YonMooKwan and YeonMuKwan) Headquarters in 1973 and took over Korea Hapkido YonMuKwan Association. He moved to the United States in 1981, and opened Myung's Hapkido in Detroit, Michigan. He organized World Hapkido Headquarters - Hapkidowon in 1981, which relocated to Corona, California, in 2004.

Hapkidowon is a place of education for the dynamic art of Hapkido in its authentic form. Offensive and defensive skills are taught in various real world applications in the following scenarios: empty hand vs. empty hand (맨손 對 맨손), empty hand vs. weapon or weapon vs. empty hand (맨손 對 무기) and weapon vs. weapon (무기 對 무기). Empty hand techniques include joint locking, kicking, punching, throwing and immobilization. Weapons techniques include the knife, cane, rope, Dan bong, Jung Bong, Jang bong, So Bong and sword.

Philosophy

Five Commandments
Hapkidowon philosophy and teachings are composed of moral ethics in addition to physical techniques with the belief that those who are trained in the art must also learn to use their skills responsibly.

Meaning of Hapkidowon
Hap:  합:合 = Hap means "harmony", "coordinated" or "joining"; put [bring] together, combine, unite, join together
Ki      :  기:  氣 =  Ki describes internal energy, spirit, strength, or power; vigor, energy, vitality, strength, force, spirits, stamina, virility 
Do    : 도:道 = Do means "way" or "art", yielding a literal translation of "joining-energy-way" 
Won:원:院 = Won means: house for learning, foundation, academy. Also Association (as in Kuk Sool Won)
Hapkido won (Hangul: 합기도원)means house for learning Hapkido. It is the International Hapkido Organization, also known as World Hapkido Headquarters (Hangul: 세계합기도본부), and home to authentic Hapkido

Meaning of the Hapkidowon symbol
The symbol represents the principles of Hapkido's concept and technique in the form of 원 (won, circle), 방(bahng, square), and 각(gahk, triangle). Won represents the heaven (or universe), bahng within the won represents the earth, and the gahk represents a man. As the logo shows, the earth is contained within the universe and the earth is surrounded by men. The symbol is the unification of the universe, the earth and the man: this is the Hapkido's accord and principle.

It represents the boundless or limitless (無極, Mu Geuk) Grand Way (大道, Dae Doh) to Unify (十, Siep – meaning numeral ten – also represents combined whole) the Heaven (上, Sang), Earth (下, Hah), and All Points (八方, Pahl-Bahng) of a man's surrounding (氣, Ki).  Therefore, 上下八方無極大道 means in short “The way to unify the boundless heaven and earth with a man’s surrounding Ki”.
The globe represents the vision of the Hapkidowon to create the international cultural heritage beneficial to all mankind through Hapkido in all corners of the world. And the logo bears the word 합기도원 (Hapkidowon) in Korean where the art was born, and supplemented with the Hapkidowon, World Hapkido Headquarters.

See also
Korean martial arts
Choi Yong Sul
Seo Bok-Seob

Further reading
 HAPKIDO World Seminar 2010 Europe / TKD Times 
 Int'l Master Class Hapkido Seminar 2011 Europe / TKD Times 
 HAPKIDO World Seminar 2012 USA / The Orange County Register 
 HAPKIDO World Seminar 2013 Europe / The Korea Times 
 세계합기도원 '월드세미나' 개최 / 한국일보 The Korea Times, Korean vernacular daily newspaper in Seoul, Korea.
 합기도의 우수성 전파 |세계합기도원, 싱가포르 월드세미나 초빙|한국일보 The Korea Times, Korean vernacular daily newspaper in Seoul, Korea.

References

External links
 세계합기도원 | Hapkidowon - World Hapkido Headquarters - the official Hapkidowon site
 Facebook - Hapkidowon 
 한국어 - Hapkidowon / Korean

Sports organizations established in 1981
1981 establishments in South Korea
Hapkido organizations